The 2001 Open Gaz de France was a women's tennis tournament played on indoor hard courts at the Stade Pierre de Coubertin in Paris, France, and was part of Tier II of the 2001 WTA Tour. It was the ninth edition of the tournament and ran from 6 February until 11 February 2001. Eighth-seeded Amélie Mauresmo won the singles title and earned $90,000 first-prize money.

Finals

Singles

 Amélie Mauresmo defeated  Anke Huber 7–6(7–2), 6–1
 It was Mauresmo's only singles title of the year and the 3rd of her career.

Doubles

 Iva Majoli /  Virginie Razzano defeated  Kimberly Po /  Nathalie Tauziat 6–3, 7–5
 It was Majoli's only title of the year and the 8th of her career. It was Razzano's only title of the year and the 1st title of her career.

External links
 ITF tournament edition details
 WTA tournament draws

Open Gaz de France
Open GDF Suez
Open Gaz de France
Open Gaz de France
Open Gaz de France
Open Gaz de France